The Wakaf Bharu railway station is a Malaysian train station stationed at and named after the town of Wakaf Bharu, Tumpat, Kelantan. This is nearest station accessible to Kota Bharu, state capital of Kelantan.

Train services
 Ekspres Rakyat Timuran 26/27 Tumpat–JB Sentral
 Shuttle Timur 51/52/57/60 Tumpat–Gua Musang
 Shuttle Timur 55/56 Tumpat–Dabong

Around the station
 Malaysia Federal Route 134

External links

KTM East Coast Line stations
Railway stations in Kelantan
Tumpat District